Lela Tsurtsumia  (born 12 February 1969) is a Georgian pop singer and actress. Born and raised in Tbilisi, she graduated in Shota Rustaveli Theatre and Film University. She sings in native Georgian, Megrelian and Laz languages.

Life and career 

Tsurtsumia has been active in music since the age of five and has been working with vocal teachers. Theatrical education helped her to create an individual musical image and manner.

In 1996–1999, Lela became a singer in ensemble "Taigouli". She start performing songs at the restaurant "Europa" Where she met her future manager and husband Kakha Mamulashvili.

Her concert in 2000 was the first show concert in Georgia held by Georgian a singer.

In 2002, Tsurtsumia had another successful show at Tbilisi Sport Hall, with more than 25,000 spectators attending the show, arecord. Another record was set in 2004, when she released the popular album Suleli Tsvima ("Crazy Rain"), which sold more than 60,000 copies in Georgia. Tsurtsumia also has sold more than 10,000 albums abroad, in Israel, the U.S., and Russia.

Tsurtsumia's songs are covered in other countries. In Armenia she's so popular, that songs like "Samba" and "Love Story" charted No. 1 in the country and were covered by Armenian singers.

After 2006, Tsurtsumia appeared on stage only with her live jazz band.

On 11 August 2006, she had a live concert in Zugdidi in front of more than 40,000 people.

In 2007, Tsurtsumia signed with the label Art Lend and her albums were distributed on some European e-stores, such as The Orchard.

Band 

Irakli Menteshashvili – keyboards
Chabuka Amiranashvili – saxophone
Maia Kachkachishvili – keyboards
Lasha Abashmadze – bass guitar
Levan Sharashidze – guitar
Ramaz Khudoevi – percussion
Nika Abashmadze – drums
Vaska Kutuxov – garmoni
Gio Mamula
Shota – duduning

Backing vocals
Rati Durglishvili
Gvanca Kachkachishvili

Sound engineer
Alex Nonikof

Discography

Studio albums 
 Paemani (Date, 2000)
 Ocneba Shenze ("Dream of You", 2000)
 Suleli Tsvima ("Stupid Rain", 2004)
 Popular Duets (2005)
 Tsamebs Shentvis Vinakhav ("I Save Seconds for You", 2006)
 Yamo Helessa ("Lord Have Mercy", 2006)

Compilation albums 
 The Best (2002)
 The Best (Israel, 2006)
 The Best (USA, 2006)

Filmography

Film

References

External links 

official web-page

1969 births
Living people
20th-century women singers from Georgia (country)
Folk singers from Georgia (country)
Pop singers from Georgia (country)
Folk-pop singers
Musicians from Tbilisi
21st-century women singers from Georgia (country)